Calling My Children Home is an album by the progressive bluegrass band Country Gentlemen, recorded in 1976-1977 and released in 1978.

Track listing 

 "The Place Prepared for Me" (Sweatman) – 2:17
 "I'm Ready to Go Home" (Hazel Houser) – 3:51
 "Hallelujah Side" (Entwisle, Oatman) – 2:53
 "Palms of Victory" (Matthias) – 3:35
 "Calling My Children Home" (trad.) – 2:46
 "Inside the Gate" (J.D. Sumner) – 2:33
 "I've Never Been There" (Parris) – 2:21
 "The Great Beyond" (Reed) – 3:37
 "Lord, I'm Just a Pilgrim" (trad.) – 3:01
 "Where Could I Go But to the Lord" (Coats) – 3:44
 "Come on, Dear Lord, and Get Me" (Easterlin) – 2:16
 "Where No Cabins Fall" (Jeffress)–  2:38

Personnel 
 Charlie Waller - guitar, vocals
 Doyle Lawson - mandolin, vocals
 James Bailey - banjo, vocals
 Bill Yates - bass, vocals

with
 Spider Gillam - bass
 Ed Ferris - bass, vocals
 Bill Holden - vocals

References

External links 
 

1978 albums
Rebel Records albums
The Country Gentlemen albums